Attorney General Montgomery may refer to:

Betty Montgomery (born 1948), Attorney General of Ohio
John Montgomery (Maryland politician) (1764–1828), Attorney General of Maryland